Menno Oosting and Libor Pimek won in the final 6–3, 7–6 against Martin Damm and Hendrik Jan Davids.

Seeds

  Tomás Carbonell /  Javier Sánchez (semifinals)
  Menno Oosting /  Libor Pimek (champions)
  Marc-Kevin Goellner /  David Prinosil (first round)
  Martin Damm /  Hendrik Jan Davids (final)

Draw

References
 1996 Croatian Indoors Doubles Draw

Doubles
Doubles
Croatian Indoors - Doubles